The Edinburgh Cup was a greyhound racing competition held annually at Powderhall Stadium in Powderhall, Scotland.

It was inaugurated in 1933 and was considered one of the major competitions in the greyhound calendar. In Scotland only the Scottish Greyhound Derby was held in higher esteem.

Two English Greyhound Derby winners Rushton Mac and Pigalle Wonder both won the competition on two occasions.

The race ended in 1995 following the closure of Powderhall Stadium.

Past winners

Discontinued

Sponsors
1982-1982 Kenny Waugh Bookmakers
1994-1994 Regal

Venues & Distances
1933-1971 	(Powderhall 500 yards)
1975-1995 	(Powderhall 465 metres)

References

Greyhound racing competitions in the United Kingdom
Greyhound racing in Scotland
Sports competitions in Edinburgh
Recurring sporting events established in 1933